The Malian or Maliac Gulf is a gulf in the western Aegean Sea. It forms part of the coastline of Greece's region of Phthiotis. The only harbour is that of Stylida, which serves the city of Lamia. To its east is Cape Lichada, the northwesternmost point of the island of Euboea.

Name
The gulf is named after the ancient Malians who lived on its shores.

History
Due to the constant accretion of silt from the river the Spercheios and smaller streams, the gulf has been shrinking over the centuries. In the summer of 426 BC, a tsunami hit the gulf between the northwest tip of Euboea and Lamia. The ancient strait of Thermopylae, which at the time the famous battle was fought, was delineated by Mount Kallidromo and the Malian Gulf, has now become a broad coastal plain.

Under the London Protocol of 1830, the line connecting the Malian Gulf and the Aspropotamos River was established as the northern border of the newly independent Greek state.

References 

Gulfs of Greece
Landforms of Phthiotis
Gulfs of the Aegean Sea
Landforms of Central Greece